Kigali-Rural Province, known in Kinyarwanda as Kigali-Ngali, was a province that surrounds the city of Kigali, Rwanda. It was abolished in 2006, along with other existing provinces at the time, in favour of a system of redrawn provinces.

Former provinces of Rwanda
States and territories disestablished in 2006